The 2014 NBL Canada Finals was the championship series of the 2013–14 National Basketball League of Canada season and the conclusion of the season's playoffs. The Central Division champions Windsor Express played against the Atlantic Division champions Island Storm, in a best-of-seven series. The Windsor Express won the series 4–3. The Finals began on April 4, and ended on April 17. The Express claimed their first title ever and Stefan Bonneau was named Finals MVP.

Series 

All times are in Eastern Daylight Time (UTC-4)

Game 1

Game 2

Game 3

Game 4

Game 5

Game 6

Game 7

References

External links
NBL Canada 2014 Finals

National Basketball League of Canada Finals
Finals